Dane O'Neill is an Irish jockey, who has won over 1,700 races in Great Britain over a 25-year career, including the 2015 Commonwealth Cup at Royal Ascot.

Career

O'Neill was born in Dublin, but brought up in Monkstown, County Cork. His uncle was a trainer, and his family had always been interested in racing. He was a skilled showjumper in his youth, and also rode 24 winners in pony races.

He moved to Britain aged 17 and spent his early career riding for Richard Hannon Sr. His first winner was Port Sunlight, at Sandown Park on 15 July 1993. Winners were slow to come, and in his first three seasons, he only rode seven. His career took a step forward in 1996 when he won the apprentice jockeys’ championship with 67 wins.

For Hannon, he won several big sprint races on Bold Edge, including the Cork and Orrery Stakes at Royal Ascot and the Diadem Stakes in 1999 and his first Group 1, the Prix Maurice de Gheest in August 2000. He also won the Jersey Stakes at the 1999 Royal Ascot on Lots of Magic.

2003 was his most successful year to date with 110 winners. These included Airwave in the Group 2 Temple Stakesfor Henry Candy, and another Royal Ascot winner, Macadamia in the Royal Hunt Cup for James Fanshawe. In total, he won over £1.3 million in prize money during the year.

It was five years before he reached 100 winners or £1 million in prize money again, aided by wins in the Stewards' Cup for William Haggas on Conquest I.

He spent a period as stable jockey to Henry Candy. Then, in October 2012, he was appointed second jockey to Sheikh Hamdan al Maktoum, behind Paul Hanagan. The Maktoum partnership led him to the biggest prize of his career - the first Commonwealth Cup at Royal Ascot in 2015 on Muhaarar trained by Charlie Hills. On Mukhadram he finished third in the 2014 King George VI and Queen Elizabeth Stakes.

By the end of 2017, he had nearly 1,700 career victories in Britain, and became the seventh most prolific winner among current jockeys on the retirement of Jimmy Fortune.

Statistics

Flat wins in Great Britain by year

Major wins 
 Great Britain
Commonwealth Cup - (1) Muhaarar (2015)
Diamond Jubilee Stakes- (1) Bold Edge (1999)
British Champions Sprint Stakes - (1) Bold Edge (1999)

 France
Prix Maurice de Gheest - Bold Edge (2000)

 United Arab Emirates
 Jebel Hatta - (2) - Alfareeq (2022, 2023)

Notes

References 

Irish jockeys
Living people
Year of birth missing (living people)